Korenevsky (masculine), Korenevskaya (feminine), or Korenevskoye (neuter) may refer to:
Korenevsky District, a district of Kursk Oblast, Russia
Korenevskaya, a rural locality (a village) in Arkhangelsk Oblast, Russia